Inauguration of George Washington may refer to:

 First inauguration of George Washington, 1789
 Second inauguration of George Washington, 1793